Mariano Ernesto Sosa (born 3 November 1975) is an Argentine rower. He competed in the men's coxless four event at the 1996 Summer Olympics.

References

1975 births
Living people
Argentine male rowers
Olympic rowers of Argentina
Rowers at the 1996 Summer Olympics
Place of birth missing (living people)
Pan American Games medalists in rowing
Pan American Games bronze medalists for Argentina
Rowers at the 2011 Pan American Games
Medalists at the 2011 Pan American Games